Home Plate is the fifth album by Bonnie Raitt, released in 1975.

Track listing

Personnel
Bonnie Raitt – guitar, electric guitar, vocals (all), slide guitar, electric slide guitar (9)
Harry Bluestone – concert master
George Bohanon – trombone, baritone saxophone, bass trumpet
Jackson Browne – vocals, background vocals
Rosemary Butler – vocals, background vocals
Venetta Fields – vocals, background vocals
Freebo – bass, guitar, tuba, vocals, guitarron, fretless bass
Jim Gordon – baritone saxophone
Debbie Greene – vocals, background vocals
John Hall – guitar, electric guitar
Emmylou Harris – vocals, background vocals
John Herald – vocals, background vocals
Dick Hyde – trombone, trumpet, bass trumpet; horn (as Richard Hyde)
Jerry Jumonville – tenor saxophone
Jef Labes – keyboard
Maxayn Lewis – vocals, background vocals
Gary Mallaber – drums
Will McFarlane – guitar, electric guitar
Robbie Montgomery – vocals, background vocals
Bill Payne – accordion, keyboard, vocals
Jeff Porcaro – percussion
Greg Prestopino – vocals, background vocals
Terry Reid – vocals, background vocals
John Sebastian – autoharp, harp
William D. "Smitty" Smith – piano, keyboard
J.D. Souther – vocals, background vocals
Fred Tackett – synthesizer, acoustic guitar, guitar, mandolin, keyboard, 12 string guitar, Fender Rhodes
Willow VanDer Hoek – vocals, background vocals
Tom Waits – vocals, background vocals on "Your Sweet and Shiny Eyes"
Dennis Whitted – drums
Jai Winding – piano, keyboard, clavinet

Production
Producer: Paul Rothchild
Engineer: Fritz Richmond
Remastering supervisor: Ed Cherney
Remastering: Gregg Geller
Project coordinator: Jo Motta
Horn arrangements: Nick DeCaro, Jerry Jumonville, Bill Payne, Fred Tackett
String arrangements: Nick DeCaro
Art direction: Lockart
Photography: Michael Dobo, Norman Seeff
Cover photo: Norman Seeff

Charts
Album - Billboard (United States)

References

Bonnie Raitt albums
1975 albums
Albums produced by Paul A. Rothchild
Warner Records albums